The 1995 AFL Ansett Australia Cup was the Australian Football League Pre-season Cup competition played in its entirety before the Australian Football League's 1995 Premiership Season began. It culminated the final in March 1995.

Games

Round of 16

|- bgcolor="#CCCCFF"
| Home team
| Home team score
| Away team
| Away team score
| Ground
| Crowd
| Date
| Time
|- bgcolor="#FFFFFF"
| Fremantle
| 13.8 (86)
| St Kilda
| 19.7 (121)
| East Fremantle Oval 
| 10,028
| Friday 24 February 1995
| 4:00 PM
|- bgcolor="#FFFFFF"
| Carlton
| 20.9 (129)
| Richmond
| 13.9 (87)
| Waverley Park
| 23,678
| Saturday, 25 February 1995
| 8:00 PM
|- bgcolor="#FFFFFF"
| North Melbourne
| 17.18 (120)
| Brisbane
| 8.12 (60)
| Waverley Park
| 4,737
| Sunday, 26 February 1995
| 1:05 PM
|- bgcolor="#FFFFFF"
| Essendon
| 14.10 (94)
| Fitzroy
| 8.13 (61)
| Waverley Park
| 10,469
| Monday, 27 February 1995
| 8:00 PM
|- bgcolor="#FFFFFF"
| Collingwood
| 12.15 (87)
| Footscray
| 12.16 (88)
| Waverley Park
| 18,310
| Wednesday 1 March 1995
| 8:00 PM
|- bgcolor="#FFFFFF"
| Sydney
| 18.11 (119)
| Hawthorn
| 16.10 (106)
| Bruce Stadium
| 11,644
| Saturday 4 March 1995
| 1:05 PM
|- bgcolor="#FFFFFF"
| Melbourne
| 11.11 (77)
| West Coast
| 16.15 (111)
| Waverley Park
| 9,348
| Saturday, 4 March 1995
| 8:00 PM
|- bgcolor="#FFFFFF"
| Adelaide
| 23.16 (154)
| Geelong
| 13.15 (93)
| Football Park
| 13,866
| Sunday 5 March 1995
| 12:05 PM

Quarter-finals

|- bgcolor="#CCCCFF"
| Home team
| Home team score
| Away team
| Away team score
| Ground
| Crowd
| Date
| Time
|- bgcolor="#FFFFFF"
| St Kilda
| 12.11 (83)
| Carlton
| 12.10 (82)
| Waverley Park
| 12,476
| Monday 6 March 1995
| 8:00 PM
|- bgcolor="#FFFFFF"
| North Melbourne
| 14.18 (102)
| Essendon
| 11.9 (75)
| Waverley Park
| 19,492
| Wednesday, 8 March 1995
| 8:05 PM
|- bgcolor="#FFFFFF"
| Footscray
| 10.12 (72)
| Sydney
| 16.10 (106)
| Waverley Park
| 10,721
| Saturday 11 March 1995
| 8:00 PM
|- bgcolor="#FFFFFF"
| Adelaide
| 14.14 (98)
| West Coast
| 6.11 (47)
| Football Park
| 18,909
| Sunday, 12 March 1995
| 12:05 PM

Semi-finals

|- bgcolor="#CCCCFF"
| Home team
| Home team score
| Away team
| Away team score
| Ground
| Crowd
| Date
| Time
|- bgcolor="#FFFFFF"
|  St Kilda
| 12.11 (83)
| North Melbourne
| 13.14 (92)
| Waverley Park
| 15,873
| Wednesday 15 March 1995 
| 8:00 PM
|- bgcolor="#FFFFFF"
| Adelaide
| 18.11 (119)
| Sydney
| 14.7 (91)
| Football Park
| 31,159
| Saturday, 18 March 1995
| 8:00 PM

Final

|- bgcolor="#CCCCFF"
| Home team
| Home team score
| Away team
| Away team score
| Ground
| Crowd
| Date
| Time
|- bgcolor="#FFFFFF"
| North Melbourne
| 14.9 (93)
| Adelaide
| 8.15 (63)
| Waverley Park
| 39,393
| Saturday 25 March 1995
| 8:00 PM

See also

List of Australian Football League night premiers
1995 AFL season

References

Australian Football League pre-season competition
Ansett Australia Cup, 1995